WWE Survivor Series is a professional wrestling video game developed by Natsume and published by THQ for the Game Boy Advance handheld console. WWE Survivor Series is based on the World Wrestling Entertainment (WWE) annual pay-per-view, Survivor Series. The game is the sequel to Road to WrestleMania X8. WWE Survivor Series was also the last WWE video game released for a Nintendo handheld console until WWE SmackDown vs. Raw 2008 for the Nintendo DS in 2007.

With it being two years since the last Game Boy Advance WWE game, the roster is vastly different from previous one and included eight Raw and eight SmackDown! wrestlers. The story mode was changed to accompany the WWE's Brand Extension from 2002, meaning the player could choose a particular brand to get to the top before switching brands to conquer another brand. The story mode was also changed in that winning matches wasn't necessarily the main aim. Instead, the aim was to give out a good match and make matches less one-sided.

Reception

WWE Survivor Series received "mixed" reviews according to video game review aggregator Metacritic.

See also

 List of licensed wrestling video games
 List of fighting games

References

2004 video games
Game Boy Advance games
Game Boy Advance-only games
Natsume (company) games
THQ games
Video games developed in Japan
WWE video games
Survivor Series
Professional wrestling games